Urban Tarzan is a television series that aired on Spike. The show features John Brennan and his career as an animal wrangler for Steve Irwin, along with his assistant Jay Cassidy. The show was created by Lorraine Yarde and Mark Basile  The series aired for ten episodes.

References

2010s American reality television series
Spike (TV network) original programming
2013 American television series debuts
Year of television series ending missing